Lempert is a surname. Notable people with the surname include:

Jochen Lempert (born 1958), German photographer
László Lempert (born 1952), Hungarian-American mathematician
Phil Lempert (born 1953), American television personality
Ted Lempert (born 1961), American politician
Werner Lempert, East German slalom canoeist